Oscar Ameringer (August 4, 1870 – November 5, 1943) was a German-American Socialist editor, author, and organiser from the late 1890s until his death in 1943. Ameringer made a name for himself in the Socialist Party of Oklahoma as the editor of its newspaper and a prominent organiser for the party. His most famous work, The Life and Deeds of Uncle Sam, was a widely read satire of American history that sold over half a million copies and was translated into 15 languages. His wit as a speaker and writer and his reputation as being one of the grand old men of left-wing politics in the United States led to him being described as the "Mark Twain of American Socialism".

Background

Oscar Ameringer was born in Achstetten, Germany in 1870. He came to America at the age of 15.

He taught himself English by reading books supplied by a helpful—and perceptive—librarian, and went on to become a self-taught musician, portrait painter, writer, editor, political organizer, and standup-comedian who warmed up crowds for Eugene Debs and other socialist luminaries.

Career

Ohio

His father, a cabinet maker, sent young Oscar to join his brother in Cincinnati, Ohio, where he tried his hand as a furniture maker and musician. He joined the Knights of Labor in 1886 and the American Federation of Musicians in 1903, but soon found his way into the newspaper industry working for a union newspaper in Columbus, Ohio. This paper, called the Labor World, introduced Ameringer to the labor struggles in the South, and he was soon on the front lines of a bitter labor dispute in New Orleans, Louisiana.

Oklahoma

After briefly organizing workers in Louisiana, Ameringer moved to Oklahoma to work for the Socialist Party. In Oklahoma, he was identified with the state party's social democratic "Yellow" faction, which supported replicating the centralized organizational model established by Victor L. Berger in Milwaukee, which was opposed by the more left-wing "Red" faction, which advocated greater decentralization. In spring of 1907, Ameringer started his first camp meeting tour of Oklahoma moving from town to town and relying on the hospitality of local farmers sympathetic to his cause. Although known for rousing speeches filled with humor and wit, Ameringer believed "something more than schoolhouse meeting, encampments and soap-box preaching was needed if the world was to be saved".

In 1909, Ameringer along with other Socialists formed the Industrial Democrat, but the paper's initial assignment covering a debate on a proposed amendment to weaken state power over corporations caused a fracture between Ameringer and the paper. He was fired from the editor position, only to move to the Socialist party's new paper, the Oklahoma Pioneer.

In 1911, Ameringer made a major push into politics running for mayor of Oklahoma City. He gathered twenty-three percent of the vote and "came within a few hundred votes of being elected". Of course, the noted humorist described his loss as "a narrow escape both for Oklahoma socialism and [himself]". In 1912, the Oklahoma Socialist Party voted to abolish the Oklahoma Pioneer as its official newspaper and a year later recalled Ameringer from his seat on the National Executive Committee<ref>James R. Green (1978). Grass-Roots Socialism. Baton Rouge, LA: Louisiana State University Press, pg. 278.</ref> as a result of a factional struggle within the party.

Wisconsin

By 1913, Ameringer had already moved to Milwaukee to serve as county organizer for the Socialist Party of Milwaukee County and work as a columnist and editor on their newspaper, the Milwaukee Leader. After another unsuccessful foray into politics in Wisconsin, in which his campaign was derailed by his arrest and indictment for obstruction of recruiting by the United States army, Ameringer decided to move again. He claims in his autobiography that "the idea behind the sensational arrests was to destroy [him and other Socialists] politically".

Oklahoma
After his Wisconsin years, Ameringer moved back down to Oklahoma to fight against a Ku Klux Klan candidate for governor and then to Illinois in 1920 where he edited the Illinois Miner, a publication aimed against UMWA president John L. Lewis. In 1931, Ameringer again returned to Oklahoma and founded what would be his last newspaper, The American Guardian.The American Guardian continued in existence for a decade, finally being terminated early in 1941. The paper's subscriber list was assumed by the national liberal news weekly, The Nation,'' with the folksy populist Ameringer bringing his regular column to that publication's pages.

Personal life and death

Oscar Ameringer died age 73 on November 5, 1943.

References

External links
 

 "Two of a Kind", 1921- Ameringer's response to the Russian Revolution 

1870 births
1943 deaths
German emigrants to the United States
People from Biberach (district)
Achstetten
Politicians from Milwaukee
Editors of Wisconsin newspapers
Journalists from Oklahoma
National Chairmen of the Socialist Party of America
Socialist Party of America politicians from Oklahoma
Socialist Party of America politicians from Wisconsin
Writers from Oklahoma
Writers from Wisconsin
American trade unionists of German descent